Újbuda Football Club is a professional football club based in Újbuda, Budapest, Hungary, that competes in the Nemzeti Bajnokság III, the third tier of Hungarian football.

History
The club merged with Budafoki MTE in 2013.

Honours

Domestic
Nemzeti Bajnokság III:
Third (1): 2010–11

References

External links
 Profile on Magyar Futball

Football clubs in Hungary